Properigea costa, the barrens moth, is a species of cutworm or dart moth in the family Noctuidae. It was first described by William Barnes and Foster Hendrickson Benjamin in 1923 and it is found in North America.

The MONA or Hodges number for Properigea costa is 9589.

References

Further reading

 
 
 

Xylenini
Articles created by Qbugbot
Moths described in 1923